Prince Abdullah Al-Mutaib Al-Rasheed (1906–1946) (Known as Known as Abdullah II) was the 11th Emir of the Emirate of Jabal Shammar in 1920 until 1921.

Biography 
He is a prominent member of the al-Rashid dynasty and son to Emir Mitab II. His father was killed by an unknown insurgent. At the end of March 1920, his cousin, Emir Saud ibn Abd al-Aziz, was assassinated by his cousin Abdullah ibn Talyah, who was shot dead by one of the emir's servants. Power was passed to Abdullah ibn Mutaib.

With the rise of Abd al-Aziz ibn Saud, Emir of Najd, a longtime enemy of the Emirate of Jebel Shammar, Abdullah decided to make an alliance with Hussein bin Ali, king of Hejaz, who enjoyed British support. In response, Ibn Saud, in March 1921, launched a military campaign against the Emirate of Jebel Shammar. In April, Abdullah ibn Mitab was defeated and retreated to Ha'il. At this time, Muhammad ibn Talal, the governor of Al-Jawf, swore allegiance and promised to defend Ha'il. However, Abdullah, who had no faith in it, ordered that Muhammad be arrested and sent to prison.

Abdullah Al Rashid decided to stay in protection within his fortress. But when recourses ran out, he entered into negotiations with Abd al-Aziz ibn Saud. The latter insisted on a complete and unconditional surrender, which did not suit Abdallah. The inhabitants of Ha'il managed to defend their leader and they continued to hold the siege, which was accompanied by small skirmishes.

Soon the hierarchy released Muhammad ibn Talal from prison and overthrew Abdullah. Abdullah ibn Mutaib lived in exile in the city of Riyadh until his death in 1946.

References 

20th-century rulers in Asia
People from Ha'il
House of Rashid
1906 births
1946 deaths